Liam Griffin (born 9 March 1973 in Barnet, Greater London) is a British auto racing driver and businessman. He is the son of John Griffin and was CEO of minicab company Addison Lee for 10 years before carrying out a management buyout with the private equity firm Carlyle. He is currently the Vice Chairman of Addison Lee.

He has competed in the 24 Hours of Le Mans twice and currently races in the European Le Mans Series. He has also represented Ireland at Triathlon in the European and World Age Group Championships.

Racing career

Early years
Griffin started racing in 2008, competing in the VW Cup. He spent two years in the series, collecting three podiums and two race wins. In 2009 he entered two rounds of the Porsche Carrera Cup Great Britain at Silverstone, driving for Motorbase Performance. He returned for a full season in 2010 for the team, driving in the Pro-Am 1 class, he finished twenty-first overall in the driver standings.

British Touring Car Championship

Motorbase Performance (2011–13)

Griffin raced in the BTCC for 3 years and had a number of top 10 finishes and 1 front row grid start as a result of the reverse grid. In his final year he competed in the Jack Sears Trophy where he had 8 Class wins and finished 2nd in the Championship.

For 2011 he entered the British Touring Car Championship. Staying with Motorbase, he drove a Ford Focus ST.

Griffin stayed with Motorbase in 2012, now racing under the Redstone Racing banner. He brought out the safety car at Croft after crashing his Redstone Racing Focus into the tyre wall, causing an engine fire. Griffin pulled out of the following meeting at Snetterton in order to focus on his business commitments during the 2012 Summer Olympics. He returned to the team at Silverstone and participated in the final two rounds of the season. After the final round at Brands Hatch, Griffin intended to retire from the BTCC.

In February 2013, Motorbase Performance announced that Griffin would race for them in the Jack Sears Trophy, driving the Super 2000 specification Ford Focus in 2013. Griffin took two class victories at the season opening Brands Hatch round to lead the trophy going to the second around at Donington Park.

Racing record

Complete British Touring Car Championship results
(key) (Races in bold indicate pole position – 1 point awarded in first race) (Races in italics indicate fastest lap – 1 point awarded all races) (* signifies that driver lead race for at least one lap – 1 point awarded all races)

Complete British GT Championship results
(key) (Races in bold indicate pole position) (Races in italics indicate fastest lap)

Complete FIA World Endurance Championship results

24 Hours of Le Mans results

Complete European Le Mans Series results

‡ Half points awarded as less than 75% of race distance was completed.

References

External links
BTCC official site
Motorbase Performance

Living people
English racing drivers
People from Chipping Barnet
1974 births
24 Hours of Le Mans drivers
British Touring Car Championship drivers
British GT Championship drivers
Porsche Carrera Cup GB drivers
Dakar Rally drivers
Aston Martin Racing drivers
24H Series drivers